Zhangsun was a Chinese compound surname of Xianbei origin. People with this surname included:

Zhangsun Shunde (565–631), general of the Tang dynasty
Empress Zhangsun (601–636), first empress consort of the Tang dynasty
Zhangsun Wuji (died 659), prime minister of the Tang dynasty and Empress Zhangsun's brother